The 2007–08 ICC Intercontinental Cup was the fourth ICC Intercontinental Cup tournament, an international first-class cricket tournament between nations who have not been awarded Test status by the International Cricket Council. The first fixtures were played in June 2007, and the final took place from 30 October to 2 November 2008 in Port Elizabeth, South Africa. The same eight countries as in the previous edition were participating. The eight teams played each other in a round robin format. Namibia won the round-robin, but lost the final against Ireland, making it Ireland's third consecutive title in this competition.

Table

Win – 14 points
Draw if more than 8 hours of play lost – 3 points (otherwise 0 points)
First Innings leader – 6 points (independent of final result)
Abandoned without a ball played – 10 points.

Matches

2007 season

2007–08 season

2008 season

2008–09 season

Final

Statistics and Records
Statistics and records for the 2007–08 Intercontinental Cup after the final.

Most runs

Most wickets

References

2007-08
International cricket competitions in 2007
International cricket competitions in 2007–08
International cricket competitions in 2008
International cricket competitions in 2008–09